Sophia McDougall (born 1979) is a British novelist, playwright, and poet.

Life and career
McDougall is best known internationally as the author of alternate history novels published by Orion Publishing Group and based on the premise that the Roman Empire survived to contemporary times. She studied English at Oxford University.

Books

Romanitas trilogy
Romanitas (2005), Orion Books - 
Rome Burning (2007), Orion Books - 
Savage City (2010), Orion Books -

Other novels
Mars Evacuees (2014), Egmont - 
Space Hostages (2017)

External links
 Review of Romanitas

1979 births
Living people
21st-century English novelists
English dramatists and playwrights
British alternative history writers